Cliodynamics is a transdisciplinary area of research that integrates cultural evolution, economic history/cliometrics, macrosociology, the mathematical modeling of historical processes during the longue durée, and the construction and analysis of historical databases.

Cliodynamics treats history as science. Its practitioners develop theories that explain such dynamical processes as the rise and fall of empires, population booms and busts, and the spread and disappearance of religions. These theories are translated into mathematical models. Finally, model predictions are tested against data. Thus, building and analyzing massive databases of historical and archaeological information is one of the most important goals of cliodynamics.

Etymology
The word cliodynamics is composed of clio- and -dynamics. In Greek mythology, Clio is the muse of history. Dynamics, most broadly, is the study of how and why phenomena change with time.

The term was originally coined by Peter Turchin in 2003, and can be traced to the work of such figures as Ibn Khaldun, Alexandre Deulofeu, Jack Goldstone, Sergey Kapitsa, Randall Collins, John Komlos, and Andrey Korotayev.

Mathematical modeling of historical dynamics
Many historical processes are dynamic, in that they change with time: populations increase and decline, economies expand and contract, states grow and collapse, and so on. As such, practitioners of cliodynamics apply mathematical models to explain macrohistorical patterns—things like the rise of empires, social discontent, civil wars, and state collapse.

Cliodynamics is the application of a dynamical systems approach to the social sciences in general and to the study of historical dynamics in particular. More broadly, this approach is quite common and has proved its worth in innumerable applications (particularly in the natural sciences).

The dynamical systems approach is so called because the whole phenomenon is represented as a system consisting of several elements (or subsystems) that interact and change dynamically (i.e., over time). More simply, it consists of taking a holistic phenomenon and splitting it up into separate parts that are assumed to interact with each other. In the dynamical systems approach, one sets out explicitly with mathematical formulae how different subsystems interact with each other. This mathematical description is the model of the system, and one can use a variety of methods to study the dynamics predicted by the model, as well as attempt to test the model by comparing its predictions with observed empirical, dynamic evidence.

Although the focus is usually on the dynamics of large conglomerates of people, the approach of cliodynamics does not preclude the inclusion of human agency in its explanatory theories. Such questions can be explored with agent-based computer simulations.

Databases and data sources
Cliodynamics relies on large bodies of evidence to test competing theories on a wide range of historical processes. This typically involves building massive stores of evidence. The rise of digital history and various research technologies have allowed huge databases to be constructed in recent years. 

Some prominent databases utilized by cliodynamics practitioners include:
 The Seshat: Global History Databank, which systematically collects state-of-the-art accounts of the political and social organization of human groups and how societies have evolved through time into an authoritative databank. Seshat is affiliated also with the Evolution Institute, a non-profit think-tank that "uses evolutionary science to solve real-world problems."
 D-PLACE (Database of Places, Languages, Culture and Environment), which provides data on over 1,400 human social formations.
 The Atlas of Cultural Evolution, an archaeological database created by Peter N. Peregrine.
 CHIA (Collaborative for Historical Information and Analysis), a multidisciplinary collaborative endeavor hosted by the University of Pittsburgh with the goal of archiving historical information and linking data as well as academic/research institutions around the globe.
 International Institute of Social History, which collects data on the global social history of labour relations, workers, and labour.
Human Relations Area Files (eHRAF)
 Archaeology
 World Cultures
 Clio-Infra, a database of measures of economic performance and other aspects of societal well-being on a global sample of societies from 1800 CE to the present.
 The Google Ngram Viewer, an online search engine that charts frequencies of sets of comma-delimited search strings using a yearly count of n-grams as found in the largest online body of human knowledge, the Google Books corpus.

Research

Areas of study
As of 2016, the main directions of academic study in cliodynamics are:
 The coevolutionary model of social complexity and warfare, based on the theoretical framework of cultural multilevel selection
 The study of revolutions and rebellions
 Structural-demographic theory and secular cycles
 Explanations of the global distribution of languages benefitted from the empirical finding that the geographic area in which a language is spoken is more closely associated with the political complexity of the speakers than with all other variables under analysis.
 Mathematical modeling of the long-term ("millennial") trends of world-systems analysis,
 Structural-demographic models of the Modern Age revolutions, including the Arab revolutions of 2011.
 The analysis of vast quantities of historical newspaper content, which shows how periodic structures can be automatically discovered in historical newspapers. A similar analysis was performed on social media, again revealing strongly periodic structures.

Organizations 
There are several established venues of peer-reviewed cliodynamics research: 
 Cliodynamics: The Journal of Quantitative History and Cultural Evolution is a peer-reviewed web-based (open-access) journal that publishes on the transdisciplinary area of cliodynamics. It seeks to integrate historical models with data to facilitate theoretical progress. The first issue was published in December 2010. Cliodynamics is a member of Scopus and the Directory of Open Access Journals (DOAJ).
 The University of Hertfordshire's Cliodynamics Lab is the first lab in the world dedicated explicitly to the new research area of cliodynamics. It is directed by Pieter François, who founded the Lab in 2015.
 The Santa Fe Institute is a private, not-for-profit research and education center where leading scientists grapple with compelling and complex problems. The institute supports work in complex modeling of networks and dynamical systems. One of the areas of SFI research is cliodynamics. In the past the institute has sponsored a series of conversations and meetings on theoretical history.

Criticism
Critics of cliodynamics often argue that the complex social formations of the past cannot and should not be reduced to quantifiable, analyzable 'data points', for doing so overlooks each historical society's particular circumstances and dynamics. Many historians and social scientists contend that there are no generalisable causal factors that can explain large numbers of cases, but that historical investigation should focus on the unique trajectories of each case, highlighting commonalities in outcomes where they exist. As Zhao notes, "most historians believe that the importance of any mechanism in history changes, and more importantly, that there is no time-invariant structure that can organise all historical mechanisms into a system."

Fiction
Isaac Asimov invented the fictional precursor to this discipline, in what he called psychohistory, as a major plot device in his Foundation series of science fiction novels.

See also
 Critical juncture theory
 Generations (book)
 Historical geographic information system
 Sociocultural evolution
 Historical dynamics

References

Bibliography

 
 
 
 
 Finley, Klint. 2013. "Mathematicians Predict The Future With Data from the Past." Wired.
 
 
 
  (segment starts at 47:18)
 
 Komlos J., Nefedov S. 2002. Compact Macromodel of Pre-Industrial Population Growth. Historical Methods. (35): 92–94.
 
 
 
  (Excerpts) (Publisher's page)
 
 Korotayev A. et al., A Trap At The Escape From The Trap? Demographic-Structural Factors of Political Instability in Modern Africa and West Asia. Cliodynamics 2/2 (2011): 1-28.
 
 
 
 
 
 
 
 
 
 
 
 Tsirel, S. V. 2004. On the Possible Reasons for the Hyperexponential Growth of the Earth Population. Mathematical Modeling of Social and Economic Dynamics / Ed. by M. G. Dmitriev and A. P. Petrov, pp. 367–9. Moscow: Russian State Social University, 2004.
 
 
 
 
 Turchin P. 2006. Population Dynamics and Internal Warfare: A Reconsideration. Social Evolution & History 5(2): 112–147 (with Andrey Korotayev).
  (on Google Books)

Further reading

External links

Cliodynamics: The Journal of Quantitative History and Cultural Evolution
Seshat: Global History Databank 
Peter Turchin's Cliodynamics Page
 Historical Dynamics in a time of Crisis: Late Byzantium, 1204-1453 (a discussion of some concepts of cliodynamics from the point of view of medieval studies)
 "Nature" article (August 2012): Human cycles: History as science
Evolution Institute

Cyclical theories
Dynamical systems
Econometric modeling
Economic history studies
Social history